ROCS Lan Yang (FFG-935) is a Chi Yang-class frigate of the Republic of China Navy.

Construction 
Constructed by Avondale Shipyard, Westwego, Louisiana and laid down 14 May 1969, launched 7 March 1970, and delivered 6 April 1971. She was commissioned 24 April 1971, christened by Mrs. Caroline Groves Gayler.

Design and description
The Knox class design was derived from the  modified to extend range and without a long-range missile system. They displaced  at full load. Their crew consisted of 13 officers and 211 enlisted men.

The ships were equipped with one Westinghouse geared steam turbine that drove the single propeller shaft.

The Knox-class ships were armed with a 5"/54 caliber Mark 42 gun forward and a single 3-inch/50-caliber gun aft. They mounted an eight-round ASROC launcher between the 5-inch (127 mm) gun and the bridge. Close-range anti-submarine defense was provided by two twin  Mk 32 torpedo tubes. The ships were equipped with a torpedo-carrying DASH drone helicopter; its telescoping hangar and landing pad were positioned amidships aft of the mack. Beginning in the 1970s, the DASH was replaced by a SH-2 Seasprite LAMPS I helicopter and the hangar and landing deck were accordingly enlarged. Joseph Hewes had the first deployed LAMPS helicopter in the history of the Navy. Aft of the flight deck was an eight-cell BPDMS missile launcher for Sea Sparrow missiles, later replaced by Phalanx CIWS.

Modifications
The  and subsequent ships of the  class were modified to enable them to serve as flagships. The primary change was a slightly different arrangement of the "Officer's Country" staterooms with additional staterooms in a new 01 level structure which replaced the open deck between the boats. The stateroom on the port side under the bridge was designated as a "flag" stateroom, with additional staterooms for flag staff when serving as a flagship. These ships have been referred to as the Joseph Hewes-sub-class .

Service history
On 15 February 1985, Joseph Hewes arrived to the scene where the M/V A. Regina, a passenger cargo ferry ran aground on a reef off Isla de Mona. Due to surf conditions, Joseph Hewes was unable to use its boats to transport the evacuees which had landed on the nearby island. Joseph Hewes remained on scene to assist and using its helicopter, delivered hot food, soft drinks, and water to the A. Regina evacuees on Mona Island.

The ship was decommissioned 30 June 1994 and struck 11 January 1995. She was disposed of through the Security Assistance Program (SAP), transferred, cash sale, ex-US fleet hull foreign military sale, transferred to as Taiwan as Lan Yang (FF-935).

Awards
Combat Action Ribbon
Joint Meritorious Unit Award with oak leaf cluster
Meritorious Unit Citation
Navy E Ribbon (3 awards)
Navy Expeditionary Medal
National Defense Service Medal with bronze star
Armed Forces Expeditionary Medal with two bronze stars
Vietnam Service Medal with one campaign star
Sea Service Deployment Ribbon
Republic of Vietnam Campaign Medal

See also
USS Trippe (FF-1075)
USS Kirk
USS Brewton

Notes

References

External links
http://ussjosephhewes.com/
NavSource images
Navysite.de

 

Ships built in Bridge City, Louisiana
Knox-class frigates
1970 ships
Ships transferred from the United States Navy to the Republic of China Navy